is a railway station owned by Kintetsu Railway and located in Saidaiji Kunimichō Itchōme, a suburb of the city of Nara in Japan.

Lines
Kintetsu
Nara Line (A26)
Kyoto Line, Kashihara Line (B26)
Yamato-Saidaiji Station is a junction of lines coming from four directions: the Nara line from Osaka in the west and Nara in the east, the Kyoto line from Kyoto in the north, and the Kashihara Line from Kashihara in the south.

Layout

This station has three island platforms serving five tracks on the ground. The station building is located to the north and south of the platforms and tracks, connecting NaRa Family, bus stops and taxi stands from the north gates and connecting the overbridge from the south gates.

Station shopping mall "Time's Place Saidaiji" is located on the 2nd level, housing 32 stores such as restaurants, souvenir stores and convenience store Family Mart. The shopping mall opened on September 11, 2009, with the location of 3 elevators connecting a platform each.

Surroundings

North
NaRaFamily
Kintetsu Department Store Nara
ÆON Nara
Sanwa City Saidaiji
Akishino-dera
Place Heijō Palace used to be

South
Kintetsu Saidaiji Building
Kintetsu Saidaiji Shopping Center
SupermarketKINSHO Saidaiji
Kintetsu Daini Saidaiji Building
Saidaiji Daini Shopping Center
Saidai-ji
Saidaiji Police Box
Kintetsu Saidaiji Inspection Depot

Bus stops
Buses are operated by Nara Kotsu Bus Lines Co., Ltd.
Bus stop 1
Route 11 for Ichijo Senior High School
Route 12 for JR Nara Station via Hokkeji, Ichijo Senior High School and Kintetsu Nara Station
Route 14 for JR Nara Station via JASDF Nara Base, Hokkeji, Ichijo Senior High School and Kintetsu Nara Station
Route 73 for Utahimecho
Bus stop 2
Route 72 for Oshikuma

Incidents 

On 8 July 2022, the area near the north entrance of the station became a crime scene when former Japanese Prime Minister Shinzo Abe was assassinated while campaigning around the vicinity.

Adjacent stations

External link 
 Official Kintetsu station page

References

Railway stations in Nara Prefecture
Railway stations in Japan opened in 1914
Buildings and structures in Nara, Nara